The Diocese of Luleå is a Swedish diocese of the Church of Sweden with its Episcopal see in the city of Luleå.

List of Bishops 
Olof Bergqvist, 1904–1937
Bengt Jonzon, 1937–1956
Ivar Hylander, 1956–1966
Stig Hellsten, 1966–1980
Olaus Brännström, 1980–1986
Gunnar Weman, 1986–1993
Rune Backlund, 1993–2002
Hans Stiglund, 2002–2018
Åsa Nyström, 2018–present

References

 
Lulea
Luleå
1904 establishments in Sweden
Christian organizations established in 1904